Bekir Sıtkı Erdoğan (1926 – August 24, 2014) was a Turkish poet and songwriter.

He graduated in 1948 from a military college and served as a regimental officer. Later he graduated from the Faculty of Linguistics, History and Geography and taught literature at the Turkish Naval High School, the German Deutsche Schule and Marmara College.

Career 

Erdoğan has written folk poetry in syllabic metric and aruz. He used Turkish lyrics in a number of songs. His Ruba'ic poems were published by Hisar.

He wrote the lyrics for the 50th anniversary of the Turkish Republic; "Cumhuriyetin 50. Yıl Marşı". The musical was organized by Necil Kazım Akses.

Bibliography 

 Bir Yağmur Başladı (1949-1957)
 Dostlar Başına (1965)
 Kışlada Bahar (1970)
 Binbirinci Gece

Music lyrics 

 Kara gözlüm efkarlanma gül gayri (1963)
 Ve Ben Yalnız (1968, Music by Selmi Andak)
 Hancı (1977, Music by Gaston Rolland; Arrangement by Paul Mauriat - Toccata)

See also 

 List of composers of classical Turkish music

References 

Composers of Ottoman classical music
Composers of Turkish makam music
1926 births
2014 deaths